Hansrote is an unincorporated community village in Morgan County in the U.S. state of West Virginia located along the old Baltimore and Ohio Railroad (B&O) mainline on the Potomac River. Hansrote is northeast of Magnolia and southwest of Doe Gully. Stuart Tunnel connected Hansrote and Magnolia by railroad, but today Hansrote is accessible by way of Hansrote Road (West Virginia Secondary Route 12/2) from Magnolia Road (West Virginia Secondary Route 12). The former B&O mainline is now part of CSX Transportation and is a popular location with railfans.

See also
 Shenandoah (B&O train)
 Washingtonian (B&O train)

References

Unincorporated communities in Morgan County, West Virginia
Unincorporated communities in West Virginia
Baltimore and Ohio Railroad
West Virginia populated places on the Potomac River